International Noise Awareness Day is a global campaign, founded in 1996 by the Center for Hearing and Communication (CHC), aiming to raise awareness of the effects of noise on the welfare and health of people. Noise affects people in many ways, but only deafness and annoyance receive actual interest from the general public. Worldwide, people are called upon to take part via various actions on this occasion: open days on hearing from acousticians, lectures in public health departments, universities and schools, panels of experts, noise level measuring actions, and readings.

The day is commemorated on the last Wednesday of April of each year. Activities aimed at creating a focus not only on noise, but also on means of reducing noise levels, are organized in a number of countries all over the world, including Brazil, Chile, Germany, Italy, Spain and the United States. In recent years, there have been related events initiated in Asia, including Singapore and Australia.

See also 
 Environmental noise
Safe listening
World Hearing Day

References

External links
Awareness: Noise health effects. Beyond annoyance
International Noise Awareness Day in Brazil 
International Noise Awareness Day in Germany
International Noise Awareness Day in Italy
European acoustic association 
The noisiest country in the world survey 
 International Noise Awareness Day 
World Listening Project
Center for hearing and communication - International Noise Awareness Day
American Speech-Language-Hearing Association
Center of Disease Control and Prevention resources for International Noise Awareness Day, 2021

Awareness days
April observances
Noise pollution
Environment and society